Kartano is the 2nd district of the city of Lahti, in the region of Päijät-Häme, Finland. It borders the districts of Niemi in the north, Kiveriö in the east, Keski-Lahti in the south, Salpausselkä in the southwest and Jalkaranta in the west.

The district takes its name from the Fellman Manor; the Finnish word kartano directly translates to "manor" in English.

The population of the statistical district of Kartano was 5,614 in 2019.

Hakatornit 
The Hakatornit are a series of seven nine-floor apartment buildings on the Paasikivenkatu street in Kartano. Designed by architects Mauri Karkulahti and Eino Tuompo and constructed in 1951–1956, the towers have been proclaimed a built cultural environment of national significance by the Finnish Heritage Agency.

See also 
 Lahti bus station
 Vesijärvi railway station

References